Jeffcott is a surname. Notable people with the surname include:

 John Jeffcott (1796–1837), first judge of the Supreme Court of South Australia
 John Moore Jeffcott (1817–1892), Isle of Man advocate and politician
 William Jeffcott (1800–1855), judge of the Supreme Court of New South Wales

See also
 Jeffcoat, surname
 Jeffcott rotor